André Möllestam (born 14 May 1991) is a Swedish footballer who plays for FC Höllviken as a defender.

References

External links

Fotbolltransfers profile

1991 births
Living people
Association football defenders
Malmö FF players
U.S. Lecce players
IF Brommapojkarna players
F.C. Lumezzane V.G.Z. A.S.D. players
Swedish footballers